The battle of Ayn Saylam was a battle between the forces of Tutush, the Seljuk ruler of Syria and brother of the Seljuk sultan Malik Shah, and Suleiman ibn Qutalmish, the Seljuk ruler of Anatolia in June 1086 close to the city of Aleppo.

Background
In 1081, Suleiman had come to an agreement with Emperor Alexios I Komnenos about the division of Western Anatolia between their two powers which allowed Alexios to focus on the Norman invasion of the Balkans and Suleiman to consolidate his power and expand into Eastern Turkey and Syria. In 1083, Suleiman had taken Tarsus and he proceeded to conquer Antioch in December 1084. This brought him into conflict with the Uqaylid ruler of the neighbouring city of Aleppo, Muslim ibn Quarysh, and the latter was defeated and slain in a battle in June 1085. Suleiman attempted to capture Aleppo the same year but failed. Tutush, the Seljuk ruler of Syria, felt threatened by Suleiman's action who was additionally a cousin and thus a possible threat to the throne. Although he did not control Aleppo directly, the city was in his sphere of influence.

When Suleiman tried to conquer Aleppo the following year again, Tutush responded to the calls for help of Aleppo's ruler and came with an army against Suleiman.

Battle
The two armies met at Ayn Saylam and Süleiman's all-out attack was routed by Turkmens under Artuk Beg. It seems that Süleiman was abandoned by a number of his closest companions as Tutush succeeded in winning them over before the battle.

Aftermath

In the aftermath, Suleiman was killed. It was only in late 1092 after Malik Shah's death that Kilic Arslan could escape and attempt to reclaim his father's dominion which had started to fracture into various principalities under independent warlords such as Tzachas, Elchanes and Poulchanes.

Tutush took briefly control of Aleppo but then retreated. While it has been suggested that he fled the approach of his brother Malik Shah in fear of retribution for killing their relative, it is more likely that he went to relieve his capital Damascus which had come under siege by the Fatimids.

Notes

References

Sources

Ain Salm
Battles involving the Seljuk Empire
11th century in the Seljuk Empire